Shirk may refer to:

 Shirk (surname)
 Shirk (Islam), in Islam, the sin of idolatry or associating beings or things with Allah
 Shirk, Iran, a village in South Khorasan Province, Iran
 Shirk-e Sorjeh, a village in South Khorasan Province, Iran
 "Shirk break", a synonym for coffee break
 Shirking model, part of the economic principle of the efficiency wage
 USS Shirk (DD-318), a United States Navy destroyer in service 1921 to 1930

See also
 Shirag, a village in Birjand County, South Khorasan Province, Iran